Cham-e Shir (also Romanized as Cham-e Shīr and Cham Shīr; also known as Cham-e Zavīyeh) is a village in Rudbar Rural District, Central District, Sirvan County, Ilam Province, Iran. At the 2006 census, its population was 520, in 109 families. The village is populated by Arabs.

References 

Populated places in Sirvan County
Arab settlements in llam Province